Hellinsia hoguei is a moth of the family Pterophoridae. It is found in Mexico.

References

Moths described in 1996
hoguei
Moths of Central America